The European Museum of the Year Award (EMYA) is presented each year by the European Museum Forum (EMF) under the auspices of the Council of Europe. The EMYA is considered the most important annual award in the European museum sector.

History
The EMYA was founded in 1977 by British journalist Kenneth Hudson, British academic Richard Hoggart, and John Letts, under the auspices of the Council of Europe. It is considered to be the most important award in its sector, being described by the Network of European Museums (NEMO) as "the longest-running and most prestigious museum awards in Europe".

The Fonds de dotation de l’ICOM of the International Council of Museums supports the European Museum of the Year Award.

Awards

Categories
Since 1977, the EMF has presented two main awards:
 European Museum of the Year
 Council of Europe Museum Prize

Three additional prizes were subsequently added to the EMF awards: 
 In 2010, the Kenneth Hudson Award for daring achievement.
 In 2011, the Silletto Prize for community/cultural engagement. 
 In 2019, the Portimão Museum Prize for the most welcoming museum.
 In 2020, the Meyvaert Museum Prize for Sustainability for "exceptional commitment to social, economic and environmental sustainability".

Criteria
The EMF state that the European Museum of the Year is based on:

The EMF state that the Council of Europe Museum Prize is based on:

Judging
Museums in 47 European countries, all members of the Council of Europe, can take part in the competition if they are newly opened or have undergone modernization or expansion in the past three years.

European Museum of the Year winners (1977–)
The following are the winners of the main European Museum of the Year award:

Council of Europe Museum Prize winners (1977–)
The following are the winners of the Council of Europe Museum Prize award:

Kenneth Hudson Award winners (2010–)
The following are the winners of the Kenneth Hudson Award:

Silletto Prize winners (2011–)
The following are the winners of the Silletto Prize:

Portimão Museum Prize winners (2019–)
The following are the winners of the Portimão Museum Prize:

Meyvaert Museum Prize for Sustainability winners (2020–)
The following are the winners of the Meyvaert Museum Prize for Sustainability:

See also

 List of awards for contributions to culture
 Europa Nostra
 The Best in Heritage
 Museum of the Year

References

External links
 EMYA Winners

Awards established in 1977
Museum awards
Museum events
Museum
Annual events in Europe
Museums in Europe